Engal Thanga Raja is a 1973 Indian Tamil-language film, directed and produced by V. B. Rajendra Prasad. The film stars Sivaji Ganesan, Manjula and Sowcar Janaki. It is a remake of the 1972 Telugu film Manavudu Danavudu, and loosely adapts the 1886 novel Strange Case of Dr Jekyll and Mr Hyde by Robert Louis Stevenson.

Plot

Cast 
Sivaji Ganesan as Dr. Thangaraja (alias) Raja/Pattakathi Bhairavan
Manjula as Vasanthi
Sowcar Janaki as Seetha
Major Sundarrajan as Kadhar Bai/Thatha
R. S. Manohar as Vedhachalam
S. V. Ramadas as Dharmalingam
Nagesh as Gopi
Rama Prabha as Radha
Ganthimathi as Kanaga
C.I.D.Sakunthala as Rani (Dancer)
Veeraraghavan as College Principal 
Master Giri as Young Raja
Gemini Mali as Ramlal Sett
Comedy Shanmugam as Anthonysamy
T. K. S. Natarajan as Raja College Mate
S. R. Janaki as Appakadai Aaya

Soundtrack 
The music was composed by K. V. Mahadevan.

Reception 
Kanthan of Kalki said the story was being driven by Janaki. The film ran for over 100 days in theatres.

References

External links 
 

1970s Tamil-language films
1973 films
Films based on British novels
Films directed by V. B. Rajendra Prasad
Films scored by K. V. Mahadevan
Tamil remakes of Telugu films